Chris Evert was the defending champion but did not compete that year.

Barbara Paulus won in the final 6–4, 5–7, 6–1 against Lori McNeil.

Seeds
A champion seed is indicated in bold text while text in italics indicates the round in which that seed was eliminated.

  Manuela Maleeva-Fragnière (quarterfinals)
  Lori McNeil (final)
  Mary Joe Fernández (second round)
  Nathalie Tauziat (first round)
  Catarina Lindqvist (quarterfinals)
  Patricia Tarabini (first round)
  Neige Dias (second round)
  Brenda Schultz (second round)

Draw

References

External links
 1988 European Open Draw

WTA Swiss Open
European Open - Singles